Anna Thistle is a Canadian politician. She represented the electoral district of Grand Falls-Windsor-Buchans in the Newfoundland and Labrador House of Assembly from 1996 to 2007. She was a member of the Liberal Party of Newfoundland & Labrador.

Thistle worked for the Canadian Imperial Bank of Commerce at various branches in Newfoundland and Labrador. Then, in 1977, she became the first manager for the Newfoundland and Labrador Credit Union branch in Grand Falls-Windsor, serving in that position until her election to the provincial assembly in 1996. She was elected to the first council for the amalgamated town of Grand Falls-Windsor in 1990 and was reelected in 1993. Thistle took responsibility for developing and implementing the town and region's Strategic Economic Development Plan.

In 1998, she was named President of Treasury Board. In 2001, she was named Minister of Labour and, in 2003, Minister of Youth Services and Post-Secondary Education.

Thistle did not stand for re-election in the 2007 general election.

References

External links
 

Liberal Party of Newfoundland and Labrador MHAs
Women MHAs in Newfoundland and Labrador
Living people
Year of birth missing (living people)
People from Grand Falls-Windsor
21st-century Canadian politicians
21st-century Canadian women politicians